Beit Qad is a Palestinian rural village in the West Bank governorate of Jenin. The village is located 5km from the city of Jenin and according to the Palestinian Central Bureau of Statistics (PCBS) in 2016 it had a population of 1,799.

History
The village is associated by some scholars with a biblical locality in the Kingdom of Israel, located between the city of  Jezreel and the kingdom's capital Samaria. It is mentioned in the Book of Kings as Beth Ekad of the Shepherds which can be translated as "meeting place of the shepherds". In this place, Jehu, king of Israel, slaughtered 42 relatives of Ahaziah, king of Judah. The village is also associated with a village mentioned in the Onomasticon (Gazetteer) of the Greek historian Eusebius called Beth Ekamat.

Some intact Roman buildings can be found in the village, and ceramics from the Byzantine era have also been found there.

Ottoman era
Beit Qad, like the rest of Palestine, was incorporated into the Ottoman Empire in 1517, and in the census of 1596, the village appeared in the nahiya of Jenin in the liwa of Lajjun. It had a population of 20 households, all Muslim.  They paid a  fixed tax rate of 25% on agricultural products, including wheat, barley, summer crops, olive trees, goats and beehives, in addition to  occasional revenues; a total of  9,500 akçe. Beit Qad was described by the census as a hamlet.

In 1838, Beit Kad was noted as one of a range of villages round a height, the other villages being named as Deir Abu Da'if, Fuku'a, Deir Ghuzal and Araneh. 

In 1870 Victor Guérin found  the village to have  200 inhabitants. In 1882,  the PEF's Survey of Western Palestine (SWP)  described Beit Kad  as  “a small village on a knoll near the plain. It has a large cemented cistern, now broken. The houses are of stone and mud.”

British era
In the 1922 census of Palestine the population of the village was 199 Muslims, decreasing slightly in the 1931 census  to 185, in 35 households. 

In  the 1944/5 statistics,  the population was 290, all Muslim, with a total of 8,915  dunams of land, according to an official land and population survey.  Of this, 608 dunams were used for  plantations and irrigable land, 6,976 dunams for cereals, while 10 dunams were built-up (urban) land.

Jordanian era
In 1948 Palestinian refugees from Mount Gilboa were absorbed in the village and stayed there as sharecroppers. The refugees who arrived to Beit Qad had the opportunity to resettle in the village instead of moving to refugee camps. In 1951 they built, with the aid of the Jordanian government, another agriculture-based village, 2km north of Beit Qad, called Mashru' Beit Qad which means "Project of Beit Qad"  

The Jordanian census conducted in 1961 recorded 247 persons in Beit Qad and 197 persons in Mashru' Beit Qad.

1967, aftermath
Since the Six-Day War in 1967, Beit Qad has been under  Israeli occupation.

In a census conducted by Israel after it occupied it, Beit Qad "south" (respectively "north") were reported to have 223 (respectively 216) residents, including 86 (respectively 53) persons in households whose head was a refugee from Israeli territory.

During the early months of the First Intifada on 27 March 1989 Anjad Hashem Nasser, 4 years old, was shot dead. Press reports said the shooter was an Israeli policeman and that the Israeli army had launched an investigation. Five months later Minister of Defence Yitzhak Rabin sent a letter to MK Yair Tsaban acknowledging that a force of the Israeli Police was in the area and "therefore" the incident was investigated by the police.

Geography
The village is located north of Deir Abu Da'if in the Jezreel Valley (known in Arabic as "Marj Ibn Āmir"). The village is split into two sections: the south and north (which is called Mashru Beit Qad) and is surrounded by fields. The village has an ancient mosque built from ancient building stones and an old Arabic maqam.

References

Bibliography

External links 
 Welcome To Bayt Qad
 Beit Qad, Welcome to Palestine
Survey of Western Palestine, Map 9: IAA,  Wikimedia commons

Villages in the West Bank
Jenin Governorate
Municipalities of the State of Palestine